Franz Walter Stahlecker (10 October 1900 – 23 March 1942) was commander of the SS security forces (Sicherheitspolizei (SiPo) and the Sicherheitsdienst (SD) for the Reichskommissariat Ostland in 1941–42. Stahlecker commanded Einsatzgruppe A, the most murderous of the four Einsatzgruppen (death squads during the Holocaust) active in German-occupied Eastern Europe.  He was fatally wounded in action by Soviet partisans and was replaced by Heinz Jost.

Early life
Stahlecker was born into a wealthy family in Sternenfels, Germany on 10 October 1900. He was the second of three sons of the pastor and director of studies Eugen Stahlecker and his wife Anna Zaiser. He served in the military from 21 September to 7 December 1918. From 1919 to 1920 Stahlecker was a member of the Deutschvölkischer Schutz und Trutzbund and the Organisation Consul.  He studied at the University of Tübingen, where he obtained a doctorate of law in 1927.  On 14 October 1932, he married Luise-Gabriele Freiin von Gültlingen; their marriage produced four children.

Early Nazi career
On 1 May 1932, Stahlecker joined the Nazi Party (no. 3,219,015) as well as the SS (no. 73,041).  On 29 May 1933, he was appointed deputy director of the Political Office of the Württemberg State Police.  In 1934, he was appointed head of the Gestapo in the German state of Württemberg and soon assigned to the main office of the Sicherheitsdienst (SD). On 11 May 1937, he became head of the Gestapo in Breslau.  After the incorporation of Austria in 1938, Stahlecker became SD chief of the Danube district (Vienna), a post he retained even after being promoted to SS-Standartenführer. In the summer of 1938, Stahlecker became Inspector of the Security Police in Austria, succeeding Gestapo chief Heinrich Müller in that position.  As of 20 August 1938, Stahlecker was the formal head of the Central Agency for Jewish Emigration in Vienna, though its de facto leader was Adolf Eichmann. Differences of opinion with Reinhard Heydrich motivated Stahlecker to move to the Auswärtiges Amt (Foreign Office), after which he held posts as the commander of the Security Police and SD in the Protectorate of Bohemia and Moravia under SS-Brigadeführer Karl Hermann Frank.  In mid-October 1939, Eichmann and Stahlecker decided to begin implementation of the Nisko Plan.

On 29 April 1940, Stahlecker arrived in Oslo, Norway, where he held various posts, most notably as commander of about 200 Einsatzgruppe members of the Security Police and SD.  He was promoted to SS-Oberführer.  He was succeeded in this position in autumn 1940 by Heinrich Fehlis.

Einsatzgruppe A
On 6 February 1941 Stahlecker was promoted to SS-Brigadeführer and Generalmajor der Polizei and took over as commanding officer of Einsatzgruppe A, in hopes of furthering his career with the Reich Security Main Office (RSHA), Nazi Germany's security police and intelligence organization. In June 1941, Einsatzgruppe A followed Army Group North and operated in Lithuania, Latvia, Estonia and areas of Russia up to Leningrad. Its mission was to hunt down and murder the Jews, Gypsies, Communists, and other "undesirables".  In a 15 October 1941 report, Stahlecker wrote:

By winter 1941, Stahlecker reported to the German government that Einsatzgruppe A had murdered some 249,420 Jews.  He was made Commander of the Security Police and the SD (Befehlshaber der Sicherheitspolizei und des SD) of Reichskommissariat Ostland, which included the occupied territory of Estonia, Latvia, Lithuania and Belarus, at the end of November 1941.  Stahlecker was fatally wounded in action on 22 March 1942, by Soviet partisans near Krasnogvardeysk, Russia.  Heinz Jost then assumed command of Einsatzgruppe A and of the Security Police and SD.

See also
Jelgava massacres
Kaunas pogrom

References

Bibliography
 

 

1900 births
1942 deaths
People from Enzkreis
People from the Kingdom of Württemberg
Nazi Party members
SS-Brigadeführer
Einsatzgruppen personnel
Jungfernhof concentration camp
German military personnel of World War I
Riga Ghetto
Lawyers in the Nazi Party
Gestapo personnel
20th-century German lawyers
University of Tübingen alumni
Holocaust perpetrators in Lithuania
Holocaust perpetrators in Latvia
Holocaust perpetrators in Russia
Holocaust perpetrators in Estonia
Holocaust perpetrators in Belarus
Holocaust perpetrators in Czechoslovakia
German military personnel killed in World War II